Santragachi Kedarnath Institution for girls is a girls' school located with the Santragachi Kedarnath Institution boys' school in Santragachi, Howrah, India.

History
The Santragachi Kedarnath Institution was a boys school before 1949. In 1949 a group of men of the school authority decided to make a girls' section. It was started with a different authority in the same building and with the same name. It received permanent affiliation on 9 January 1963.

Students
The school has about 1,500 students every year from I-XII.

Curriculum
Up to class X classes are as per the syllabus. With these, extra classes of Spoken English, computer, physical training, karate are taken. After class X the classes are divided into Arts, Commerce and Science.

Subjects after Madhyamik
Bio-science
Bengali (A)
Chemistry
Economic
Education
English (B)
History
Mathematics
Music
Nutrition
Philosophy
Physics
Political Science
Psychology

Extracurricular activities
The girls are taught karate, with a dedicated gym.
There is an annual sports day.
The Saraswati Puja is a special event; the school won best Saraswati Puja award in 2017. 
Rabindrajayanti birthday of Netaji, Republic day, Independence Day, etc. are celebrated with recitations, songs, dramas presented by the students.

References

High schools and secondary schools in West Bengal
Schools in Howrah district
Education in Howrah
1949 establishments in West Bengal
Educational institutions established in 1949